Lac de Virieu is a lake at Virieu-le-Grand in  the Ain department of France. The lake has a surface area of 4 ha and a maximum depth of 15 m.

Virieu, Lac